Drew Barrymore is an American actress and producer. She is the recipient of numerous accolades, including a Golden Globe and a Screen Actors Guild Award, as well as five Emmy Award nominations and a BAFTA nomination. She achieved fame as a child actress with her role in E.T. the Extra-Terrestrial. Following a highly publicized childhood marked by drug and alcohol abuse, she released an autobiography Little Girl Lost. She appeared in several successful films, such as Charlie's Angels, Never Been Kissed, Poison Ivy, Boys on the Side, Mad Love, Batman Forever, Scream and Ever After. She starred with Adam Sandler in three films, The Wedding Singer, 50 First Dates and Blended. Other films included Firestarter, Never Been Kissed, Donnie Darko, Riding in Cars with Boys, Confessions of a Dangerous Mind, Charlie's Angels: Full Throttle, Fever Pitch, Music and Lyrics, Going the Distance, Big Miracle, and Miss You Already. She also starred in her directorial debut film Whip It. She won a SAG Award and a Golden Globe for her role in Grey Gardens. She starred in the Netflix series Santa Clarita Diet and currently hosts the syndicated talk show The Drew Barrymore Show.

Filmography

Actress

Film

Television

Music videos

Director

Producer

Notes

References

Actress filmographies
American filmographies
Drew Barrymore